J. Hareendran Nair is an Indian Ayurveda practitioner and entrepreneur from Kerala. He is the founder of Pankajakasthuri Herbals, a business group which has contributed in promoting and popularising Ayurveda and ayurvedic products across the country. The Government of India, in 2012, honoured him with Padma Shri for his services to the cause of Ayurveda.

Biography
Hareendran Nair was born in Kattakkada, Thiruvananthapuram, in Kerala to Janardhanan Nair, a document writer and Pankajam, as the youngest of their three children. After early education at the Government Upper Primary School, Kandala and the Christian College, Kattakada, he joined the Government Ayurveda College, Thiruvananthapuram from where he graduated in ayurvedic medicine with a BAMS in 1983.

His medical career started as a research fellow at Poojappura Regional Research Institute, but he submitted his resignation from the service when he was transferred to the central Kerala town of Shornur in 1986. Nair spent the next two years in the formation of Sree Dhanwanthari Ayurvedics, the forerunner of Pankajakasthuri Herbals India Ltd [PHIL], which came into stream in 1988 at Poovachal. The early days were difficult, which changed in 1996 when Nair launched ayurvedic over-the-counter products under the brand name Pankajakasthuri, a name coined combining his mother's name, Pankajam, and his eldest daughter's name, Kasturi.

Hareendran Nair is married to Asha who is involved in the business at administrative levels. The couple has two daughters, both studying ayurvedic medicine. The family lives in Thiruvananthapuram.

Pankajakasthuri
Hareendran Nair found Pankajakasthuri in 1988, under the name Sree Dhanwanthari Ayurvedics at Poovachal, in Thiruvananthapuram. In 1996, the brand Pankajakasthuri was launched and the company's name was changed to Pankajakasthuri Herbals Pvt Ltd. Over the years, the establishment has grown to cover the parent company dealing in over-the-counter ayurvedic products, Pankajakasthuri Panchakarama spas, Pankajakasthuri Jeevanam clinics and Pankajakasthuri Ayurveda Hospital, Herbal garden and Pankajakasthuri Ayurveda Medical College, in Killi near Kattakkada, which opened on 28 August 2002, which is stated to be the first self-financed ayurveda medical college in Kerala.

Social service
Hareendran Nair is also active in social service. He has arranged for 1000 free lunches everyday through his Ayurveda medical college. He also sponsors the educational expenses of 125 students, and provides free in-patient medical treatment to 50 patients, including medicines. His group also conducts free medical camps every month in Thiruvananthapuram. "My only agenda," said Nair, "is the popularization of Ayurveda as an effective and economic mode of treatment among people."

Positions
Nair holds various positions at regional and national levels.
 Managing Director, Pankajakasthuri Herbals India Pvt. Ltd
 Managing Director, Pankajakasthuri Ayurveda Medical College
 Managing Director, Pankajakasthuri Engineering College
 Chief Executive Pankajakasthuri Panchakarma Centres
 Founder and Secretary of Pankajakasthuri Herbal Research Foundation
 Advisor on Ayurveda to the Government of Nagaland
 Member of the Regional Advisory Committee for the Organized and service tax sector in the central Excise & Customs, Thiruvananthapuram
 Member of the Medicinal Plant Board, Kerala State
 Founder Director of the Care Keralam, a cluster company in the Ayurveda sector meant to promote Kerala brand ayurvedic products
 Patron of Chinmaya Mission, Thiruvananthapuram
 Administrative Director, Neyyar Medicity, Neyyar Healthcare Pvt Ltd

Awards and recognitions
 Padma Shri – 2012
 Management Leadership Award – Trivandrum Management Association
 Sai Maa Award(international) for Ayurvedic Propagation
 Best Entrepreneur Award, Industries Department – Government of Kerala
 Yuvaprathibha Award – Ayurvedic Medical Officers Association
 Ayurvedaratna Award
 Entrepreneur of the Year Award – Berchmans Institute of Management Studies

References

External links
 Interview on YouTube
 Let's Talk – Part One – Interview on YouTube
 Let's Talk – Part Two – Interview on YouTube
 Pankajakasturi Medical College

Living people
Recipients of the Padma Shri in medicine
Malayali people
Ayurvedacharyas from Kerala
People from Thiruvananthapuram district
Businesspeople from Thiruvananthapuram
Year of birth missing (living people)